Tierney Peninsula is an ice-covered peninsula about 14 nautical miles (26 km) long, between Savage Glacier and Morgan Inlet in the east end of Thurston Island. The east extremity of the peninsula (and Thurston Island overall) is Cape Annawan. These features were discovered on helicopter flights from the USS Burton Island and Glacier of the U.S. Navy Bellingshausen Sea Expedition in February 1960 and named by the Advisory Committee on Antarctic Names (US-ACAN). The peninsula was named for J.Q. Tierney, oceanographer aboard the Burton Island on this expedition. The cape was named for the ship Annawan of the United States Expedition of 1829–31, which with the Penguin sailed west from the South Shetland Islands in February 1830, holding a course between 62S and 58S and exploring as far as 103W, northward of this cape.

Two nautical miles (3.7 km) west of the base is Pallid Crest, a solitary ice-covered ridge visible from a considerable distance and various directions. It was named by US-ACAN because of its whitish appearance.

Maps
 Thurston Island – Jones Mountains. 1:500000 Antarctica Sketch Map. US Geological Survey, 1967.
 Antarctic Digital Database (ADD). Scale 1:250000 topographic map of Antarctica. Scientific Committee on Antarctic Research (SCAR), 1993–2016.

References 

Peninsulas of Ellsworth Land
Thurston Island